Edmonson  may refer to:

Places
Edmonson County, Kentucky
Edmonson, Missouri, an unincorporated community
Edmonson, Texas, a town
Edmonson Point, Victoria Land, Antarctica

Surname
Edmonson sisters, Mary (1832–1853) and Emily (1835–1895), African-American abolitionists after being freed from slavery
Greg Edmonson, television and movie music composer
Greg Edmonson (artist) (born 1960), Canadian painter
Kat Edmonson (born 1983), American singer and songwriter
Keith Edmonson (born 1960), American former basketball player
Mike Edmonson (born 1958), superintendent of the Louisiana State Police since 2008
Munro S. Edmonson (1924–2002), American linguist and anthropologist
Travis Edmonson (1932-2009), American folk singer

See also
Edmondson (disambiguation)